Most Wanted is the fifth  studio album released by Kane & Abel. It was released on September 26, 2000, for the duo's newly formed Most Wanted Empire and was produced by the group and David Banner.

Commercial performance
In the US, the album peaked at No. 194 on the Billboard 200 albums chart, No. 40 on the Top R&B/Hip-Hop Albums chart and No. 35 on the Top Independent Albums chart. A single from the album, "Shake It Like a Dog" reached No. 5 on the Hot Rap Singles chart and No. 57 on the Hot R&B/Hip-Hop Songs chart in Billboard magazine. Most Wanted sold 8,500 copies its first week of release.

Track listing
"Informant"- 1:12
"Drama"- 4:13 (feat. Boss Playa & Fiend)
"Shake It Like a Dog"- 4:27 (feat. 5th Ward Weebie & Partners-N-Crime)
"Count Your Ones"- 3:59
"Get Right!"- 4:10
"Quick 2 Buss"- 4:17
"Jail of Eden"- :23
"Kane and Abel"- 4:58 (feat. Beautiful, Gonzalez & Logic)
"Golden Shower"- :42
"Don't Give a Fuck About Cha"- 4:13 (feat. The Pimptations)
"AKZ"- 3:28
"Lemme Get up in Ya"- 3:41
"Vic"- :15
"We Got That Candy"- 3:48 (feat. Ghetto Angel, Reynolds & Steve)
"Somebody Gotta Pay"- 4:18
"Snakes"- 3:06 (feat. Sundown)

References

2000 albums
Kane & Abel (group) albums